Melbourne High School is a government-funded single-sex academically selective secondary day school for boys, located in the Melbourne suburb of South Yarra, Victoria, Australia. Established in 1905, the school caters for boys from Year 9 to Year 12 and is known mainly for its strong academic reputation.

Melbourne High School had the leading rank based on VCE average, with its 2009 cohort achieving a median ATAR of 95.85, the highest of any Victorian school in recorded history. Students have achieved very strong results in the VCE examinations, and placements at tertiary institutions are at a rate well above Victoria's average. The school has a compulsory involvement program, including involvement within school and within the broader community. Its ethos encourages investment of effort into academic, sporting, musical, leadership, and personal pursuits. It was also the first school in Australia to establish a Student Representative Council, with the assistance of Sir Robert Menzies. In addition, the school owns an outdoor education facility in Millgrove, which lies near the Warburton ranges. Throughout this history, enrolment for Year 9 has been determined by an entrance examination, held in June each year. The entrance examination consists of an assessment of the applicant's mathematics and English skills. In 2007, 308 Year 9s entered the school, out of over 1,200 students who undertook the examination.

The school was founded in 1905 as the first co-educational state secondary school in Victoria. Melbourne High School was originally located in Spring Street in Melbourne. In 1927, the boys and girls split, with the boys moving to a new school at Forrest Hill in the inner city suburb of South Yarra which retained the name Melbourne High School. The girls eventually moved to the Mac.Robertson Girls' High School on Kings Way, Melbourne.

In 2010, The Age reported that Melbourne High School ranked equal tenth among Australian schools based on the number of alumni who had received a top Order of Australia honour.

History

Under controversial circumstances arising from the opposition of private schools, on 15 February 1905, Frank Tate, the first Director of Education, established Victoria's first state secondary school, the Melbourne Continuation School, with 135 girls and 68 boys. Tate's motivation for establishing the school was to allow students from state primary schools to continue their education, which would otherwise have ended if they could not afford to enrol at one of Melbourne's private schools.

The school's original campus was that of the Old National Model School in Spring Street, Melbourne. Joseph Hocking, an inspector of schools, was named the first principal, emerging from a large number of varied applications for the job. Hocking followed Tate's vision and moulded the school to produce students of high quality as evidenced by their final year results.

By 1919, it had the greatest number of students at Melbourne University (then Victoria's only university) from any school.

Sport, music, cadets, the school magazine and social events became important areas of the school. In 1910, the first sporting exchange with Adelaide High School occurred. This was later followed by an exchange with North Sydney Boys' High School.

In 1914, with the school just nine years old, the school's growth and development was disrupted by World War I, in which over 500 Melbourne High students served. The school has since developed a special association with Anzac Cove, sending cadets and students to participate in ANZAC Day ceremonies every year.

Hocking spoke of the students as:

The school's growth soon resumed, but the building they occupied was beginning to feel dilapidated. In the 1920s, it was announced that the school would split and the boys and girls would move to alternative locations.

In October 1927, the boys moved to Forrest Hill in South Yarra and formed Melbourne Boys' High School. The old campus was renamed Melbourne Girls' High School.

Between 1931 and 1934, the girls of the old Melbourne Continuation School moved from Government House, to the King Street Central School and finally to Albert Park, renaming the school as the Mac.Robertson Girls' High School.

The boys' new campus at Forrest Hill soon developed and traditions like the house competition began. The Depression did not prevent the expansion of the Forrest Hill campus and sporting facilities.

Old traditions in music and debating continued, with the addition of house chorals, which is now an important event in the school calendar.

New traditions emerged, such as a house system, with competition in various sports, debating and, with the strong music tradition of the school, house chorals. A Memorial Hall paid for by past students was a feature of the new school.

Just as had occurred in World War I, World War II disrupted the school's proceedings greatly. The school building itself was requisitioned by the Royal Australian Navy. The students of the school moved to either the new Camberwell High School or the Tooronga Road State School. It was only in 1944 that students returned to Forrest Hill under the new principal Major-General (later Sir) Alan Ramsay. Ramsay was the first 'Old Boy', or former student, to become principal. Since then, all but one of his successors have been Old Boys.

In the 1950s, Brigadier George Langley set up reviving the school, laying down the plans for a swimming pool and physical education centre while also reestablishing the Tecoma camp. This led to an upgrade in the school's facilities. In 1960, the physical education centre and swimming pool opened. In 1965, a new library was established. In 1968, portable classrooms were built. In 1970, the Junior Science Block was opened.

In the 1980s, the ageing buildings needed refurbishment and new facilities were needed to meet the rapidly changing demands of a modern education, most notably the need for computers. Neville Drohan, principal from 1987 to 1991, combined government funding with donations from the school community to construct a new four-storey building: the 'Nineties' building (see facilities below).

In 1992, Raymond Willis became principal and in 1995 oversaw a full refurbishment of the original building dating from 1927, including the addition of a computer suite, dark room, a new general office, improved classroom, a conference room, the heritage room and an upgraded canteen and dining area.

The original grass hockey field was replaced with a synthetic one and, next to the hockey field, two plexipave basketball courts were built.

The school oval was the next to be revamped. In 1999, new turf wickets which would be maintained by a curator were added, along with new drainage and watering as well as an upgrade to the lighting. The new oval was given the name of the Woodfull-Miller Oval in honour of Bill Woodfull, a former student and principal, and Keith Miller, another former student, both highly regarded Australian test cricketers.

Willis continued to upgrade the school's facilities with the construction of a cardio room in the Nineties building, and the addition of four junior science classrooms.

The Army Cadets and Air Force Cadets received a new building in 2002, a building which included orderly rooms, meeting rooms, seminar rooms, display areas, kitchen and toilets. In 2002, new change rooms were also constructed in the Old Boys Pavilion, along with the construction of a new hockey pavilion overlooking the synthetic hockey field.

The expansion had other ramifications. The school now had extra space and, as a result, increased its enrolment to a new high of 1,366. This meant a lower cutoff in the entrance exam, which led to the school's median ENTER dropping to second in the state. The median only returned to first place again in 2009 (see Academics).

After making numerous innovative changes and advancements, Ray Willis died in July 2004 as the school's longest serving principal and the school went into a state of mourning.

In January 2005, Jeremy Ludowyke was appointed principal. In 2007 a new Arts Centre began construction and after nearly two years was officially opened by major donator and 'old boy' Lindsay Fox (who was asked to leave during his time as a student).

In 2007, Year Ten students were assigned to produce their own 'Citizenship Statement'. The results were collated to create an official 'MHS Citizenship Statement' that details the school's expectations of its students and now appears in the student planner.

The school admits that it is primarily seen as an academic school, but it also has a wide range of co-curricular traditions of music, with massed singing, formal assemblies and speech nights, the house sporting competition, house choral competition, Army and Air Force cadet corps, current affairs groups and school sports.

During the 2020-21 COVID-19 pandemic, Melbourne High, along with every other school in Victoria, shifted to online learning from week 9 of term 1. While senior school students (years 11 and 12) returned temporarily at the end of term 2, the majority of the school remained in online learning for an unprecedented 16 school weeks. School Assessed Coursework (SACs), required for the VCE was conducted via proctorship and a large portion of unit 4 of all subjects were omitted from the study design to alleviate pressure. All extra-curricular activities, as well as many house events which are critical to school culture, did not run during this period.

In November 2020, Tony Mordini was appointed school principal.

Academics

Enrolment
Melbourne High School is the only state school for boys in Victoria which selects students solely on the basis of performance in an entrance examination. Every year, over 1,400 apply to enter Year 9 for 336 places. These placements are based on their raw results in the entrance exam. Those who were within 5 marks of the cut-off-score or did not receive a place due to the "5% rule", which prevents more than 5% of another school's cohort entering Melbourne High, are asked to participate in the Principal's Discretionary Category.

Usually 180 students are eligible to apply in this category and compete for just 15 allocated places. Students choosing to participate follow a complete application process involving:
 The submission of a portfolio demonstrating academic and co-curricular achievements;
 The student's most recent school report; and,
 A personal statement on why the student wishes to attend Melbourne High School.

A small number of students are then short-listed and interviewed. Places are also available in Year 10; in 2007, 28 students were accepted into Year 10; in 2008, 29 students were accepted after undergoing a similar process to the Principals Discretionary Category. Fewer places again are available at Year 11, these places being given based on an interview and application form. No further enrolment is available in Year 12.

The rules for entry are equal for all students during "examination entry" into the school. Students who live in the nearby area are not treated any differently from those from outer suburbs or regional areas.

The school also offers places via an arts and humanities intake, where students who can demonstrate an active interest in the arts and humanities can apply for entry at Year 11. Applicants are shortlisted then follow an interview process where they present their portfolio of work and present a statement on why they wish to attend Melbourne High School.

Academic results
Past students have achieved very strong results in the Victorian Certificate of Education (VCE) examinations, and the median ENTER for Melbourne High School in 2009 was 95.85, the highest ever and the highest median ENTER by any school in Victoria barring its sister school, Mac.Robertson Girls' High School. Over 99% of students pursue a tertiary education, and the school has the largest intake into Monash University and the University of Melbourne out of all schools.

Melbourne High School was ranked first out of all state secondary schools in Victoria based on VCE results in 2018.

In 2009, it ended its 7-year drought by achieving higher average VCE results than Mac.Robertson Girls'. A summary of the school's academic results up until 2009, a year which former principal Jeremy Ludowyke termed as "far and away the best VCE result MHS has ever achieved", through the major academic indicators used in Victoria is presented below:

Students' academic progression
Being an academically high-achieving school, Melbourne High School offers a large variety of subjects to choose from relative to other public schools. The range increases as the student moves to higher year levels.

Year 9 students at Melbourne High School study a combination of "core subjects" that are compulsory to all and "electives" that are only taken by a students who choose those subjects. The core subjects that are taken for the entire year are English, Mathematics, Science, Physical Education, History, Geography and LOTE (or "Languages Other Than English", specifically German, French, Indonesian, and Japanese). Similarly, Art (referring to visual arts) is taken for one semester and is replaced by Music for the second semester. Year 9s select one elective per semester. The electives generally cover educational areas that are not covered by the core, such as commerce or software design. Mid-year and end-of-year examinations are used to evaluate performance in each semester and determine a student's progression.

The Year 10 core subjects operate identically to the Year 9 system. However, more electives are available, and several of these electives are more specialised than Year 9 electives. Some Year 10 electives, such as Business Management, provide an introduction to the VCE Business Management course. Many Year 10 students also take the option of selecting a unit of a select few VCE subjects. These students typically advance to take units 3 and 4 of these subjects (the units that are externally examined by VCAA) in Year 11. Again, mid-year and end-of-year examinations test material for all subjects.

In addition, years 9 and 10 students devote one period a week to massed singing, an intrinsic part of the school's tradition and ethos. There is no accelerated program at Melbourne High and all students are taught at the same level. However, students identified by their teachers to have a strong aptitude for mathematics are placed into a Maths Extension program in years 9 and 10. Results in year 9 and 10 examinations also may impact on a student's ability to select a particular Unit 3/4 sequence.

In Year 11 and 12, students work towards completion of the Victorian Certificate of Education (VCE). The International Baccalaureate is not offered at Melbourne High School. The general pathway taken by students is to undertake Units 3 and 4 of one subject in Year 11, and Units 1 and 2 for five other subjects. In Year 12 students complete Units 3 and 4 for the remaining five subjects that are to count towards their VCE. Typically these are the same subjects that they completed Units 1 and 2 for in Year 11, but this is not an enforced rule, and some students attempt a 3 and 4 sequence without completing the corresponding 1 and 2 sequence. Some students make slight alterations to their VCE selections from this general pathway. University Enhancement subjects from Monash University and the University of Melbourne are an option that is taken by a small number of students each year. Some students also complete an additional Unit 3/4 sequence outside of school, often in Year 11. Unlike many other schools, Melbourne High School does not allow its students to complete two Unit 3/4 sequences inside school in Year 11, and does not allow students to complete Mathematical Methods, a very popular subject in the school, in Year 11.

The subjects chosen must include at least one English-related subject as per government regulations. For Melbourne High School students, the normal English subject is compulsory but can be replaced by English as a Second Language (ESL) for particular students. As of 2013, English Language or Literature can replace the normal English subject. Additionally, students are only allowed to select two mathematics subjects (out of the three: Further Mathematics, Mathematical Methods and Specialist Math). As in previous years, only German, French, Japanese and Indonesian are available for study in school, although students often take other LOTEs outside of school. Otherwise, the subjects offered include the entire VCE range as well as some VET courses.

Prior to the announcement of final Year 12 results, the school uses data gained from internal testing throughout the year to determine the recipients of the subject prizes, which exist for every subject.

At the end of each year students undertake a 'transition' program that introduces them into the next year. These programs are also used to help deliver other skills, including seminars on driving, interview, creating and pitching ideas for services and products (elective) and note-taking amongst other things.

Daily program
Every school day comprises seven periods (43 minutes long after the 2016 review), homeroom (or form) assembly, a recess break, and a lunch break. The school operates on a fortnightly timetable. Junior school assemblies are allocated one period a fortnight, whilst senior school assemblies are allocated one period a week. Year 9 and 10 mass singing sessions are allocated one period a week and Year 9–12 weekly sport sessions are allocated two consecutive periods a week.

Each subject will typically have one, or two consecutive periods within a day; although three and even four non-consecutive periods is not unheard of. Not all subjects are given every day, some given as little time as two periods a fortnight (e.g. Health and Personal Development) during years 9 and 10.

Most formal VCE classes are not held during Wednesdays periods 6 and 7, allowing time for students' personal study and school-assessed coursework examinations to be held.

School commences at 8:45 am every day, with the first classes starting by 9:00 am. After periods 1 to 3, there is a 26-minute recess before periods 4 to 5. A 45-minute lunch occurs before periods 6 to 7, and all formal classes end at 3:25 pm. Some students may start earlier or finish school later due to co-curricular activities (rowing notorious for early starts, and debating for evening out of school debates), or detention (typically mandating 8:00 am arrival).

As of 2011, a largely student-fought initiative led to Year 12 students not being required at school for any free periods they may have at the start or end of the day. As of 2015, Year 12 students are not required during free periods at the start of the day and may leave instead of attending free periods at the end of the day. The enforcement of attendance at form assembly has been a point of contention among senior students in recent years. Students may leave the school if they have no more formal class scheduled for the rest of the day.

Following a 2016 review of the school's curriculum, a 2-minute transition has been implemented between periods to allow teachers and students to move to their next classes. This has extended the school day from 8:50 - 3:20 to 8:45 - 3:25.

During the COVID-19 pandemic in Australia, most of Term 2 was conducted with remote learning, with students expected to check in weekly and attend all online classes. By early June, physical schooling resumed, however without assembly, weekly sports, and various co-curricular activities. From August through to October, remote learning was conducted due to the second wave in Victoria.

Grounds, buildings, and facilities
Melbourne High School has one campus, in South Yarra. This campus is split into five building blocks. These are: the Twenties Building (built in 1927, refurbished in 1995), the Nineties Building (built in 1992), the Round Building, the Junior Science Block (built in the 1970s) and the Art Building (built in 2008).

The Twenties Building is a heritage-listed, three-storey rendered brick building in the Collegiate Gothic style, which has been nicknamed by students and ex-students as the "Castle on the Hill" based on its appearance and elevated position of the site. The base level contains the school canteen, the dining hall (with microwaves and a rowing boat and canoe hanging inside), two IT rooms and four rooms devoted to mathematics. The ground level serves multiple purposes. The south wing of the ground floor generally functions as geography and mathematics rooms. The north wing of the ground floor is devoted to physics with two large classrooms and a lecture room with raked seating. Between the north and south wings is the school's Memorial Hall, the principal's office and the offices of the assistant principals. The first floor of the Twenties building is also split into two wings. The south wing is assigned to history, LOTE and politics. The north wing is assigned to chemistry.

The Nineties Building, built in the 1990s under principal Ray Willis, includes four floors, and abuts Chapel Street. The ground floor and first floors are used by the South Yarra Sports Centre, an organisation that provides its facilities both to the outside public and to students of Melbourne High. This ground floor contains a gym, including basketball courts and a swimming pool, and the first floor contains a weights room and cardio room. The second floor contains rooms used for biology, commerce related subjects and music. The third floor is used for English and also contains the school's library. (formerly in the R building)

The Science Block consists of four science labs split over two levels. These science rooms are generally used only for Year 9 and Year 10 general science, with other rooms being used for the more specific VCE subjects of chemistry, physics and biology. The Arts Building was completed in the year 2009. It consists of four floors, each containing multiple rooms devoted to the visual and performing arts. These also contain computers and media rooms.

In addition, the school's grounds include a hockey field, tennis courts, an oval (The Woodfull-Miller oval) for cricket and various codes of football, cricket nets, netball courts and basketball courts for sporting purposes. These are accompanied by the 'hockey pavilion', which overlooks the hockey field, the 'Old Boys Pavilion', which overlooks the oval, and the Cadet HQ, also near the oval. Miscellaneous features include a portable classroom east of the Art Building (typically used for mathematics), shipping containers near the art building and oval (storing a handful of row boats and canoes), a stairway to Alexandra Parade and a small garden north of the T building.

Since the 2010s, the areas around the school have been undergoing higher density development, with multi-storey towers being constructed nearby.

Ethos, culture and student life
The junior school comprises students in Year 9 and 10. They have their own four junior school captains, assemblies, and massed singing. Students in the junior school are not subject to the pressures of VCE and are encouraged to participate in extracurricular activities and broaden their education. For this reason, year 9 students must involve themselves in at least one extracurricular involvement (see below). Year 10 students complete twenty hours of community involvement throughout the year as well as an assignment on civics and citizenship to be submitted at the end of the year, (civics and citizenship classes generally occurring during transition) In Year 9, students select two electives for the year while in Year 10, students select four electives. Philosophy has been made a compulsory elective in Year 9 and economics for year 10.

The senior school comprises students in Year 11 and Year 12. There is only one Senior School Captain and senior School Vice-Captain. Particular members of the senior school will take up presidential roles of various teams, groups and organisations. At the end of every year, year elevens compete for a variety of coveted leadership positions, including positions in the SRC Leadership team and House leadership team. House captains and SRC presidents are determined by voting from the student body following a period of speech-making.

Melbourne High School Diploma

Participation and academic achievement aggregates in a points system which will culminate in the awarding of the 'MHS Diploma' at the time of the student's graduation. The first graduating class to receive the MHS Diploma was the Class of 2011. The MHS Diploma is the brainchild of Principal Jeremy Ludowyke, who strongly advocates for its continued existence as an integral part of the school's program. The Diploma is completed by passing all subjects and achieving a requisite number of points gained through involvement in co-curricular programs.

House competition
Interhouse competitions remain an integral part of the school's ethos. The four Houses with their associated colours are:

 Forrest (blue)
 Waterloo (green)
 Como (yellow)
 Yarra (red)

The names for the houses were derived from the local history of the area. The hill upon which the school is situated was first settled by Captain John Forrest, who built his house, Waterloo cottage, in Como estate alongside the Yarra River. Forrest won the inaugural cockhouse cup in 1928.

If a student entering the school has a relative who was (or is) in Melbourne High, then that student is allocated to the same house as their relative's house.

The houses compete in four major competitions:
 Swimming
Always the first event of the year, this event features students from each of the four age groups competing in a number of short and long-distance swimming events at the Melbourne Sports and Aquatic Centre's Commonwealth games outdoor swimming pool. Points are accumulated for a house both through relays and individual events. The event runs over one full day, with each individual event containing two students from each house. For the individual events, points are awarded from first place through to fourth, giving houses the opportunity to break ahead if they were to have both competitors in the top four. There are four 50m relays per age group: the A, B, C and D relays. They progressively are less valuable to the house, but are still pivotal in the final calculations for champion. There are also 200 m relays and medleys, which have the same value as an A relay. Extra points are awarded for breaking school records. An age group champion is named from each age group. Based on points awarded, swimming is the least valuable of the four majors, with first place scoring 80 points, second 64, third 56 and fourth 48.

 Athletics
The second major event of the year, the athletics competition has for several years been held over two days at Olympic Park Stadium, however in 2010 it was held on the school oval due to the Melbourne & Olympic Parks precinct redevelopment. More recently, the competition has been held at Lakeside Stadium, though in 2020, the athletics competition was again held on the school oval due to the COVID-19 pandemic. The first day largely comprises heats and C, D, E and F relays (as with swimming, the A relay is the most valuable and the F relay the least). The second day contains a large number of finals. Currently, the heats are not worth any points. In the past, the heats were worth very few points, so the second day could make or break a house's chances. The second day also features A and B relays. Other individual events include the 1500 m walk, the 3000m race and the 2000m steeplechase. These three events are open to all age groups. All other individual events are run within age groups. Both track and field events are competed in. The winner of the Athletics competition is awarded 90 points, second 70, third 60 and fourth 50 points towards the Cockhouse Cup.

 Chorals
The chorals involves the entire school in one day at the Melbourne Town Hall. It is preceded on that same day by the Instrumentals Competition, which is not a major competition, although it is one of the most important minors. The chorals competition features three pieces sung by each house: a set song, a free choice, and a special choir song. The special choir consists of between 8–20 members of the house while the set song and free choice are sung by the whole house. Rehearsals are held at recess and lunchtimes in the school's memorial hall and are generally coordinated by student leaders in the house. There is also a special choir event that sings in harmonies and more complex songs. The winner of the House Chorals competition is awarded 100 points, second 80, third 70 and fourth 60.

The most recent competition (2022) ended with results: 1st: Waterloo, 2nd: Forrest, 3rd: Yarra, 4th: Como.

 Cross Country
The cross country competition closes off the house competition and is generally the decider as the Cockhouse Cup reaches its finale. Most of the school runs 5 km around Albert Park Lake in their year levels. All positions are counted from 1st to 250th in each age group with four points being awarded for the house year group in first place, while last place receives one point. House year group points are added together to get the eventual winner of the House Cross Country. Where two houses are equal on points, the winner will be decided by the house with the highest percentage of participants (across all age groups) who have completed the course. This generally means that the house with the greatest participation wins. Waterloo ended its own cross country winning streak in 2017, losing to Como. The winner of the Cross Country competition is awarded 100 points, second 80, third 70 and fourth 60. The cross country competition was not held in 2020 due to the COVID-19 Pandemic.

They also compete in minor competitions:
 Australian Football (Junior and Senior, counted as two events)
 Basketball (Junior and Senior, counted as two events)
 Debating (Junior and Senior, Australasian/DAV style counted as one event)
 Hockey
 Football (soccer) (Junior and Senior, counted as one event)
 Theatre Sports (Junior and Senior, counted as one event)
 Volleyball
 Water Polo
 Instrumentals – one of the most hotly contested minors, the entire school watches the instrumental competition, which features around 150 students across the year levels. The competition is structured so that each house presents two soloists and one ensemble performance, each of which are judged by the same three adjudicators that judged the Chorals, and the points are tallied to find the winner. The most recent competition (2017) had results: 1st: Waterloo, 2nd: Como, 3rd: Forrest, 4th: Yarra.
 Year 9 Cockhouse Round Robin – in which the new Year 9s can pick to play a particular sport out of a wide array of sports for their house and participate in round-robin against the other houses. The main focus of the competition is to make the new Year 9s involved with their houses.

In 2020, the Cockhouse Cup was renamed to the "Derrimut" House Competition. The competition is named after Derrimut, leader of the Yalukit-willam clan of the Boonwurrung peoples.

Music program
Melbourne High School offers a music program. The school has a compulsory massed singing program for students in Year 9 and Year 10. Year 9 students also complete a semester of classroom music. The Music Department also offers a number of electives at Year 10 level in Music Craft, Music Technology, Film Music and Music Composition. At VCE level, the department currently offers VCE Music: Group Performance and VCE Music: Solo Performance. This is complemented with an instrumental tuition program on the school's campus.

Sport program

Each term students choose a sport to play during a double period once a week. There are various sports to choose from, including: rowing, sailing, cricket, football, rugby, tennis, water polo, parkour, golf, squash, cross country running, lacrosse, ten-pin bowling, badminton, lawn bowls, yoga, fencing, soccer, futsal, swimming (for weak swimmers) and Taekwondo. The school also has a burgeoning rowing program, recently establishing a sculling school. Students select new sports after a six-week rotation.

The school has an active participation in 23 different interschool sports through the Victorian Secondary Schools' Sports Association (VSSSA) and other tournaments. The school is engaged in a further 14 weekend sporting competitions, notably in the areas of water polo, which is supported by the school's indoor swimming pool, and rugby. Hockey, lacrosse, and water polo teams are entered into the Australian All Schools' Competition, in which students travel interstate to compete against teams from around the country. Other competitions specific to particular sports also exist.

The school's performance in sports has been in constant flux. In the past its strengths lay in Australian Rules Football, Melbourne High won all senior VSSSA Australian football titles between 1988 and 1996, and tennis, where Melbourne High five titles in the space of seven years between 1989 and 1995, but as the student demographic changed, so much so that currently more than 90% of students are from East Asian or South Asian background, this strength in football was replaced by greater performance in table tennis and badminton. As of the end of 2009, Melbourne High had won the senior VSSSA badminton competition three times in the last four years, had won the senior table tennis competition nine times in the last ten years and had won the intermediate table tennis competitions for the last five years. The school is also emerging in its Cross Country performance, and has won five out of the six possible VSSSA age group titles it could contend for in the last three years.

The school also has a tradition of hockey performance, and the MHSOBA uses the school's synthetic turf hockey field for its own senior and junior clubs. The school's own team has won the VSSSA crown seven times in the last nine years. A similar tradition involving the MHSOBA exists with the school's cricket teams, which have been consistently competitive, winning six VSSSA titles over the twenty-year history of the competition.

The 1st XI cricket team has in the past played matches against the Victorian Governors XI which included Merv Hughes. The school's rich cricketing history led to a 2009 visit from avid cricket fan and media personality Sir Michael Parkinson.

Leadership program
Melbourne High School has a number of leadership opportunities integrated into its leadership program. The opportunities begin as early as year 9, as every form must elect one student as its Form Captain, who serves administerial duties, and another to be its SRC representative, who represents the form in Student Representative Council meetings. In addition, two students from the year level are elected to be the year level's SRC Executives. The pre-election period for this role generally involves active campaigning by students.

In addition to these roles, there are other more senior leadership opportunities in the school. The school has four Junior School Captains (all in Year 10), a School Captain and a School Vice Captain. Several year twelves also comprise the SRC Cabinet, which includes the roles of the President, Vice-President, Secretary, Assistant Secretary, Treasurer and Assistant Treasurer. The SRC serves to advocate and promote student voice and wellbeing, and in addition, organises student initiated events such as socials, formals and inter-form competitions in games such as dodgeball or soccer.

Many involvements, including such as the Global Issues Education group, Political Interest Group, Food Interest Group and Model United Nations Student Association (MUNSA) (see below) have presidents or captains. Most sporting teams also have captains. Within the Cadet Units, there are a series of leadership positions offered to students who completed particular promotion courses over the holidays. There are also leaders in the form of the Year 11 Mentoring Program and the Millgrove Outdoor Education Center leaders.

Student leaders are often distinguishable from the rest of the students. Most leaders (apart from form captains and SRC representatives, who wear coloured badges) are distinguished through writing sewed onto their blazer pocket. The School Captain and SRC President is further distinguished through the sewing of a golden wreath around the Unicorn of their blazer pocket, whilst the School Vice-Captain and SRC Vice-President have a green wreath around the Unicorn of their blazer pocket. The house captains have a small coloured trim representing their house sewn onto the pocket, Other leadership positions can also be distinguished through badges specific to those positions (Though some badges are simply given to participants of certain student-initiated involvement groups).

The annual Ray Willis Leadership Scheme invites all of the students involved in the school's leadership program to a forum discussing a major issue, such as climate change, the Australian identity or multiculturalism. The students then form groups and conduct research on that issue for the remainder of the year, at the end of which they submit a report on their findings. Each group must contain at least one student from each year level and the report must be completed solely in the students' own time.

Involvement program
The school has an extensive program of student-run clubs, societies and special interest groups. It is compulsory for new Year 9 students to be involved in some of these groups. The school has 54 recognised involvements, groups and societies Some of the major involvements that have been integral in Melbourne High's history are Army Cadets, Air Force Cadets, Chorale, Debating, Instrumental Ensemble and Rowing. Other clubs and societies that exist include educationally themed ones such as the renowned Political Interest Group (PIG), Astronomy club, IT Programming club, Model United Nations Student Association(MUNSA), Global Issues Education (GIE) and Heritage Society as well as recreational ones such as the Bush-walking club, The Sentinel (student magazine) and FIG (Food Interest Group), otherwise known as the "Fun With Food" group. Students pursuing similar interests may gather together and form a new group of their own, subject to the approval of the school's administration, (and on students attending) The administration's flexibility in this regard has seen the recent emergence of the TCG Club, Go Club, Jewish Student Network, Students Alive (Christian Religious Group), Diplomacy Club, Marvel Club, Soccer Interest Group, Indo Club, Korean Club, and Baka Anime.

Former MHS principal once quoted, "There is a joke here that if you reside in Canberra's halls of power but you haven't been invited to Melbourne High by the PIG, you haven't really made it." The Political Interest Group has had speakers ranging from former Federal Treasurer Peter Costello, to former Prime Minister Kevin Rudd, former Prime Minister Julia Gillard (at the time, Shadow Health Minister), former Federal Minister Stephen Conroy and annually has Andrew Bolt speak at the school. Recently PIG has had journalists such as Catherine Deveny, Derryn Hinch, Barrie Cassidy as well as politicians such as Richard di Natale.

The chess club, and competition writing group are involvements that participate in interschool competitions, as do the chorale, instrumental ensemble and debating teams. Melbourne High School has been successful in each, with achievements in debating including state championships, Swannie awards and students making the national debating team. In 2008, the school also began involvement with the UN Youth Australia's Thant-Evatt Trophy – a model United Nations Security Council competition – two teams reached the state finals in that year. More recently, the establishment of MUNSA has involved more students in Model UN related activities. This includes the EVATT Competition as well as the interschool Model UN Conference held annually by MUNSA. The school has won the State Final in chess for four years running as of 2009.

In Year 9, students are introduced to the compulsory involvement program. In Year 10, students complete community involvement, which includes a day raising funds in the city for the Red Cross. In Year 11, students undertake cultural involvement, in which they experience different cultures around Melbourne.

Awards, badges, and prizes
There are School Colours for both Service and Sport. Both are in the form of ties, with a design consisting of the standard MHS tie's stripes and a unicorn at the bottom for Half Colours; and the tie stripe alternating with unicorns for Full Colours. The Unicorns on Sport Colours ties are coloured gold; the ones on Service Colours are silver.

In addition to the tie, Full Colours recipients as well as holders of some leadership positions can have their blazer emblazoned with their award or position. Position titles are emblazoned above the school emblem on the blazer pocket whilst award titles are emblazoned below. A system of badges is also employed at Melbourne High School (for house captains, SRC executives, class SRC representatives, high academic achievers, form captains and for various clubs).

The Melbourne High School Speech Night features the awarding of various prizes to particular students for performance in academic subjects, co-curricular achievements or sporting feats. The academic prizes are determined by using data delivered through internal testing of VCE students. There is one academic prize for every subject, as well as a prize for Pure Science and scientific enquiry. The sporting prizes are chosen by the heads of a particular sport to reward the individual deemed to have made the greatest contribution to that sport during their time at Melbourne High. The co-curricular prizes are similarly chosen. In addition, there are prizes for 'Best All-rounder' and 'Sports Champion'.

Brother and sister schools
Melbourne High maintains close ties with its counterpart the Mac.Robertson Girls' High School. Each year the schools join together for the Winter Concert performed at the Melbourne Town Hall, as well as a musical and a drama production performed in the school's memorial hall. Recently a fairly light-hearted Melbourne High vs MacRob Cup has begun to take place and includes events such as debating, netball, soccer and theatre sports.

Exchanges
Sister school relationships have been established internationally with high schools in Japan (Kasukabe High School), Germany (Albert-Schweitzer-Gymnasium Gundelfingen), Indonesia (SMAN 4 Denpasar), Hong Kong (Queen's College) and France (Lycée Branly Amiens, Pertuis). Annual exchanges occur with each of the sister schools, giving students the opportunity to experience both the culture and education system of another country. Each year Melbourne High either sends a group of students overseas to these schools, or hosts students from these schools. There are also opportunities for individual students to go on a longer term exchange overseas.

Crawford Shield & Prefects Cup
Melbourne High has annual sporting contests against North Sydney Boys High School and Adelaide High School during which boys from the visiting school are billeted with host families. Annual exchanges with Sydney Boys High School are also held for basketball, rowing and volleyball.

The annual competition between North Sydney and Melbourne began in 1959, when a North Sydney cricket team visited Melbourne for a one-day match in October. In subsequent years the game was increased to two days and the date changed to March so that final year boys could more easily take part. the competition was first expanded in 1969 when, at the team of the Melbourne Headmaster, North Sydney sent a water polo and swimming team to Melbourne in company with the cricketers. During the visit, it was agreed that the water polo fixture should become a permanent part of the exchange. In 1971, squash and tennis were included in the program and athletics was added in 1972. Chess was included for the first time in 1975, and in 1976 golf and debating teams also competed. Basketball was introduced in 1979. Lawn bowls and table tennis were added in 1990 and sailing and fencing in 1992. Rowing was contested in 1993 and netball was introduced in 1998. Futsal replaced netball in 2004. The Crawford Shield (inaugurated in 1972) is awarded to the overall winner from these events. In the most recent exchange (2019), 13 sports were contested.

On 10 March 2020, less than two weeks before the commencement of Crawford Shield activities, the event was cancelled due to the COVID-19 pandemic. This marked the first time the event was cancelled since its commencement in 1959.

Melbourne High competes against Adelaide High annually, typically in August. Football, hockey, rowing, badminton, basketball, cross country, debating, soccer, table tennis, tennis, theatre sports, and volleyball are contested for the Prefects' Cup. The Prefects' Cup has been held since 1910. As Adelaide High School is coeducational, the MacRobertson Girls' High School also competes, although their performance against the girls of Adelaide High has no bearing on the Prefects' Cup.

School tradition
The school motto is "Honour the work". The School motto was derived spontaneously from an eloquent address given to the assembled school by the late Frank Tate ISO, MA, a former Director of Education. In the course of his speech, he quoted the words of Edward Thring. The song is sung at the start of all school assemblies and other school gatherings such as speech nights. On normal occasions only the first two verses are sung, however on special occasions, such as ANZAC Day, the third verse is also sung.

School uniform
Students are required to wear school uniform, which consists of a black college blazer, green pullover or vest (maroon for VCE students), school tie, white business shirt, grey college trousers and/or grey college shorts, grey or black socks, black polished shoes, and the MHS maroon backpack. The blazer is woollen and is black in colour. It features a maroon and green trim which extends to the collar-region. The school logo (the unicorn) is emblazoned on the left-chest-pocket, which is also where the student leadership positions are stitched. The school blazer must be worn when travelling to and from school. In school grounds, the jumper may be worn as the outer garment. The tie features maroon and green stripes, however, students can also receive half colours and full colours, which are differently coloured ties awarded for various school achievements. Some students also received the black centenary tie in 2005, featuring both the crests of Melbourne High School and the MacRobertson Girls' High School. Recently, changes in uniform regulations allow a special short-sleeved shirt with the school logo monogrammed on the breast pocket to be worn without the tie.

Students also have access to various sports uniforms which cater for the many different sports and events students undertake. However, there is a particular set of sports uniform which is required by all students. In years 9 and 10, this sports uniform must be worn to compulsory Physical Education, and in all years, the sports uniform must be worn to most weekly sport sessions, depending upon the sport which the students choose to participate in. The compulsory sports uniform consists of a white shirt, with the unicorn featured, or a house singlet, in the colour of the students house, bottle green sports shorts, MHS sports socks (white in colour), and the appropriate runners. Extras include the white school cap, maroon school spray jacket and maroon school rugby top, which was replaced in 2011 by a cream and maroon varsity jacket for Year 12 students only. Other sports and involvement items are bought separately, such as cricket whites or other guernseys.

Principals

The following individuals have served as Principal, or any precedent title, of Melbourne High School:

: denotes an alumnus of Melbourne High School.

Melbourne High School Old Boys

Those who have left the school are known as 'Old Boys' and many join the Melbourne High School Old Boys Association. The Old Boys Association was founded in 1907, and has been in continuous operation since then. The Association provides considerable support to leaving students in their tertiary studies in the form of scholarships. The Association organises sport participation after Year 12, and the MHSOB cricket and football clubs have been historic entities. The MHSOB also has hockey and waterpolo clubs. These institutions have played their part in the production of notable Australian sportspeople, including cricketers Keith Miller and Bill Woodfull as well as a number of champion AFL footballers that includes, at least, three members of the Australian Football Hall of Fame, three Brownlow medalists, seven team-of-the-century members, eight captains, fourteen All-Australian selectees, and twenty-one best and fairest award recipients such as David Parkin, Garry Lyon and Cameron Bruce. The old Central School admission system provided some who rose, but two clubs were within two kilometres walk, and another club about four kilometres, and appropriate arrangements were made for their best education. The Old Boys' organize reunions which occur every 5 years, maintaining contact between Melbourne High alumni.

As a school that prides itself on academic success, Melbourne High School has produced individuals who have played a major role in research, government, economics and finance including Nobel laureate for medicine Sir John Eccles, who was awarded his prize for his research on the synapse. Melbourne High School students have also contributed to arts and culture. The school has produced a number of best-selling authors including Graeme Base the author of the Animalia series, Raimond Gaita a renowned author/philosopher, and Brett King, a respected author and innovator in the banking industry. The male members of the Australian band The Seekers – Athol Guy, Keith Potger and Bruce Woodley – the creators of the now folk song I Am Australian, also attended Melbourne High School, as did two finalists in the popular reality television show Australian Idol in Thanh Bui and Dean Geyer. Geyer played Brodie Roberts in the hit TV Show Glee. A large number of famous Old Boys are featured around the school's corridors in the Distinguished Old Boys gallery.

Cultural references
Melbourne High School featured on Thank God You're Here on Wednesday, 27 May 2009, where the name of the school was replaced with Kevington Grammar but footage was taken of the school building and school students.

Steven Spielberg's World War Two miniseries The Pacific, the follow-up to Band of Brothers, featured some footage of Melbourne High School, shot in December 2007.

On 13 August 2010, the Year 12 students had their formal crashed by singer Katy Perry and DJ Ruby Rose.

Lili Wilkinson's YA novel Pink is set in "The Billy Hughes School for Academic Excellence", a thinly veiled amalgamation of Melbourne High School and Mac.Robertson Girls High School based on the author's own experience of school theatre at the schools.

See also

 List of government schools in Victoria
 Australian Army Cadets
 Australian Air Force Cadets

Notes
  Who's Who of boys' school rankings: 1. Scotch College, Melbourne, 2.Melbourne Grammar School, 3.Melbourne High School, 4.Geelong Grammar School, 5.Sydney Boys High School, 6.Wesley College, 7.Shore, 8.Fort Street Boys' High, 9.North Sydney Boys High School, 10.Sydney Grammar School

References

Further reading

External links

 Melbourne High School Website
 Melbourne High School Old Boys' Association Website

Public high schools in Melbourne
Boys' schools in Victoria (Australia)
Educational institutions established in 1905
1905 establishments in Australia
Selective schools in Victoria (Australia)
Buildings and structures in the City of Stonnington
Melbourne High School